The Royal Canadian Geographical Society (RCGS) awards the Massey Medal annually to recognize outstanding personal achievement in the exploration, development or description of the geography of Canada. The award was established in 1959, by the Massey Foundation, named for industrialist Hart Massey.

Recipients
2020 - John Smol
2019 - Derek Clifford Ford
2018 - Arthur J. Ray
2017 - David Morrison
2016 - Steve Blasco
2015 - Brian Osborne
2014 - Derald Smith
2013 - David Ley
2012 - Graeme Wynn
2011 - David Livingstone
2010 - Raymond A. Price
2009 - Michael Church
2008 - Bruce Mitchell
2007 - Eddy Carmack
2006 - Serge Courville
2005 - Tim Oke
2004 - Larry Bourne
2003 - Richard Colebrook Harris
2002 - John Oliver Wheeler
2001 - Lawrence McCann
2000 - Robert McGhee
1999 - Alexander T. Davidson
1998 - William C. Wonders
1997 - James Archibald Houston
1996 - James P. Bruce
1995 - Pierre Camu
1994 - Henri Dorion
1993 - J. Gordon Nelson
1992 - Stewart Dixon MacDonald
1991 - George D. Hobson
1990 - Byron Boville1989 - John D. Mollard
1988 - John Warkentin
1987 - Charles Richard Harington
1986 - David McCurdy Baird
1985 - Morley K. Thomas
1984 - Captain Thomas Charles Pullen
1983 - Willis F. Roberts
1982 - Trevor Lloyd
1981 - Raymond Thorsteinsson
1980 - Maurice Hall Haycock
1979 - Ernest Frederick Roots
1978 - Edward Gustav Pleva
1977 - Thomas Henry Manning
1976 - Louis-Edmond Hamelin
1975 - William M. Gilchrist
1974 - Frederick Kenneth Hare
1973 - Pierre Dansereau
1972 - Isobel Moira Dunbar
1971 - John Lewis Robinson
1970 - Murray Edmund Watts
1969 - Donald Fulton Putnam
1968 - Colonel Cyril Horace Smith
1967 - J. Ross Mackay
1966 - Alf Erling Porsild
1965 - Hugh Samuel Bostock
1964 - Yves Oscar Fortier
1963 - Graham Westbrook Rowley
1962 - Diamond Jenness
1961 - Owen Connor Struan Robertson
1960 - Keith Rogers Greenaway
1959 - Henry Asbjorn Larsen

See also

 List of geography awards

External links
Massey Medal Award Recipients

Geography awards
Canadian science and technology awards
Awards established in 1959
Royal Canadian Geographical Society